In enzymology, a hydroxyisourate hydrolase is an enzyme that catalyzes the chemical reaction

5-hydroxyisourate + H2O  5-hydroxy-2-oxo-4-ureido-2,5-dihydro-1H-imidazole-5-carboxylate

Thus, the two substrates of this enzyme are 5-hydroxyisourate and H2O, whereas its product is 5-hydroxy-2-oxo-4-ureido-2,5-dihydro-1H-imidazole-5-carboxylate.

This enzyme belongs to the family of hydrolases, those acting on carbon-nitrogen bonds other than peptide bonds, specifically in cyclic amides.  The systematic name of this enzyme class is 5-hydroxyisourate amidohydrolase. Other names in common use include HIUHase, and 5-hydroxyisourate hydrolase.  This enzyme participates in purine metabolism.

Structural studies

See also
2-oxo-4-hydroxy-4-carboxy-5-ureidoimidazoline decarboxylase

References

 
 
 

EC 3.5.2
Enzymes of known structure